A Stüve diagram is one of four thermodynamic diagrams commonly used in weather analysis and forecasting. 
It was developed circa 1927 by the German meteorologist Georg Stüve (1888–1935) and quickly gained widespread acceptance in the United States to plot temperature and dew point data from radiosondes.

This diagram has a simplicity in that it uses straight lines for the three primary variables: pressure, temperature and potential temperature. The isotherms are straight and vertical, isobars are straight and horizontal, dry adiabats are also straight and have a 45° inclination to the left, while moist adiabats are curved. Wind barbs, symbols used to show wind speed and direction, are often plotted at the side of the diagram to indicate the winds at different heights.

However, using this configuration sacrifices the equal-area property of the original Clausius–Clapeyron relation requirements between the temperature of the environment and the temperature of a parcel of air lifted/lowered. Although it permits analysis of the cloud cover and the stability of the airmass, it thus does not permit calculation of the Convective Available Potential Energy (CAPE). This is why the three other thermodynamic diagrams (emagrams, tephigrams, and skew-T log-P diagrams) are most often preferred, the latter in the USA nowadays.

See also
Thermodynamic diagrams
Skew-T log-P diagram
Emagram
Tephigram

References
 
 

Atmospheric thermodynamics